The Plimsouls is the debut studio album by American power pop band The Plimsouls, released in 1981 by record label Planet. The album reached #153 on the Billboard albums chart.

Record World said of the single "Now" that "ringing guitars and defiant vocals spell hit."   

Record World said that the single "Zero Hour" is "brash, rhythmic and full of crisp guitars riffs."

Track listing 
"Lost Time" (3:41)
"Now" (2:57)
"In This Town" (2:36)
"Zero Hour" (2:30)
"Women" (2:50)
"Hush, Hush" (2:34)
"I Want What You Got" (3:25)
"Nickels and Dimes" (3:05)
"I Want You Back" (2:33)
"Mini-Skirt Minnie" (2:42)
"Everyday Things" (2:29)

References

External links 
 

1981 debut albums
The Plimsouls albums
Planet Records albums